Gaynor Clare Stanley (born 3 January 1966) is a retired British swimmer. Stanley competed in three events at the 1984 Summer Olympics. She represented England in the 200 metres breaststroke, at the 1982 Commonwealth Games in Brisbane, Queensland, Australia. Four years later she represented England in the 200 metres breaststroke, 400 metres individual medley and 800 metres freestyle, at the 1986 Commonwealth Games in Edinburgh, Scotland. She won the 1982 ASA National Championship title in the 200 metres breaststroke and the 1987 400 metres medley title.

Personal life
Stanley is the granddaughter of the footballer Alice Woods.

References

External links
 

1966 births
Living people
British female swimmers
Olympic swimmers of Great Britain
Swimmers at the 1984 Summer Olympics
Swimmers at the 1982 Commonwealth Games
Swimmers at the 1986 Commonwealth Games
Sportspeople from Manchester
Commonwealth Games competitors for England
20th-century British women